Uvita de Osa is a small town in southern Costa Rica, on a section of coastline known as the Bahía Ballena. It is notable for hosting the annual music event (Envision Festival) and being home to the Cola de Ballena (Whale's Tail) beach (Playa Uvita) which is one of the beaches comprising Marino Ballena National Park. The Whale's Tail has been described as one of the world's most beautiful beaches. Uvita is a good place to see humpback whales in the wild, as there are groups which come from Northern California and Alaska during one time of the year and groups that come from the south and Antarctica during another time of the year. Uvita has grown tremendously since the early 2000s and is the commercial center of the Costa Ballena region. Many expatriates from North America and Europe have made Uvita their home, so many of the locals speak English as well as Spanish.

History

Tourism 
Uvita has become the tourist and adventure tour hub of the Costa Ballena region. The town offers several tours ranging from whale watching to horseback riding. The town is also known for its many restaurants and accommodations catering to tourist.

Wildlife 
The region around Uvita is home to a large variety of animals.

Birds
At Hacienda Baru National Wildlife Preserve, fifteen minutes north of Uvita, more than 350 different species of birds have been identified. This number is more than one third of all the species of birds which have been identified in the entire United States and Canada combined.

 Scarlet Macaw 
 Green and Little Blue Herons
 American White Pelican
 Many varieties of Hummingbirds
 Many other species of birds, such as fiery-billed aracaris, collared aracaris, broad-winged hawks, great kiskadees, hook-billed kites, slaty-tailed trogons, flycatchers, chachalacas, crested oropendolas, collared forest falcons, chestnut-mandibled toucans, red lored parrots, saltators, orioles, kingfishers, crimson-fronted parakeets and orange-chinned parakeets.

Insects

 Hercules Beetle
 Scarabs
 Leaf-Cutter and Army Ants
 Blue Morpho and Glasswing Butterfly
 Thaos Swallowtail

Mammals

 Howler Monkey and Capuchin Monkey
 Baird's Tapir
 Pumas
 Jaguarundis
 Margays
 Ocelots
 Vampire Bats

 Bottlenose Dolphins
 Pantropical Spotted Dolphins
 Humpback Whales
 False Killer Whales
 Pilot Whales

Reptiles 

 Green Sea Turtles
 Olive Ridley Turtles
 Yellow-bellied Sea Snake
 Green or Black Iguana 
 Striped Basilisk
 Boa Constrictors
 eyelash viper 
 bushmaster
 fer de lance 
 Spectacled Caiman
 American Crocodile

Fish 

 White-tipped reef shark
 Nurse Shark
 Cortez Angelfish
 Butterfly fish
 Parrot Fish
 Puffer Fish

Amphibians 

 Giant Toad
 Red-Eyed Tree Frog
 Dart Frog
 Glass Frog

References 

Populated places in Puntarenas Province